Nevryo (or Neureo) is an Indian sweet dumpling made predominantly in Dakshina Kannada and Udupi districts of Karnataka and Goa, just before Christmas. It is also prepared during the Hindu festivals of Diwali and Ganesh Chaturthi.

Ingredients and preparation 
There are two parts of the dish. First is the dough which is made of refined flour, semolina, clarified butter or ghee, and water. The second part is the filling, which is made from grated coconut, sugar, poppy seeds, green cardamom, almonds or cashew nuts. The dough is rolled out and the filling made by mixing the ingredients is placed on one portion of the dough. The rolled, round dough is then folded in half over the filling in the shape of half moon and cut with a special cutter. The half moon dumplings are then fried in hot oil until it is golden brown. It is often equated to a gujia stuffed with jaggery and coconut.

References 

Indian desserts
Indian cuisine
Goan cuisine